Goroka is the capital of the Eastern Highlands Province of Papua New Guinea. It has an airport (in the centre of town) and is on the "Highlands Highway", about 285 km from Lae in Morobe province and 90 km from the nearby town of Kainantu also in the Eastern Highlands. Other nearby towns include Kundiawa in Simbu Province and Mount Hagen in Western Highlands Province. It has a mild climate, known as a "perpetual Spring".

It is the home of several national institutions: CRMF Christian Radio Missionary Fellowship,  the PNG Institute of Medical Research, the National Film Institute, the Liturgical Catechetical Institute, the Melanesian Institute, the Raun Raun Theatre Company and the University of Goroka. Several NGOs also have presences there, including Oxfam and Save the Children. The town's single largest hotel is the Bird of Paradise, owned by the Coral Seas Hotels chain.

Coffee is a common cash crop in the area; smaller industries include trout farms, pigs, bee keeping and food gardens (broccoli, kau kau or sweet potato, carrots, ginger and peanuts are examples of produce that grow well here; nearby Bena Bena is known for its pineapples).

Events 
In May, Goroka hosts the PNG Coffee Festival.

The Goroka Show event takes place annually around the time of the country's Independence Day (September 16). It continues for two or three days. The Goroka Show is the oldest show in Papua New Guinea, over 50 years of "keeping the spirit alive".

Climate
Goroka has a subtropical highland climate (Cfb). Due to altitude Goroka features warm to very warm afternoons and cool to mild mornings year-round, with heavy rainfall most of the year and low rainfall from June to September.

Notable people
Goroka is the birthplace of ex-Premier of Tasmania Lara Giddings
Rugby league players Stanley Gene and James Segeyaro.

See also
Goroka Urban LLG
Goroka District
Goroka languages

References

External links

The University of Goroka
Melanesian Institute
CRMF Christian Radio Missionary Fellowship
Goroka Show website
Liturgical Catechetical Institute

 
Populated places in Eastern Highlands Province
Provincial capitals in Papua New Guinea